Campsie is a small townland of the County Tyrone of Northern Ireland, in the United Kingdom. It is situated in the historic barony of Omagh East and the civil parish of Cappagh, and covers an area of 260 acres.

Landmarks
 Tyrone County Hospital (closed in 2017)
 Omagh High School
 Omagh Independent Methodist Church

References

Townlands of County Tyrone